Thomas Adams School is a coeducational secondary school boarding school and sixth form in Wem, Shropshire, England. The school takes pupils from ages 11–18 and currently has just over 1,400 on roll. The school has the Schools for Health Award and in 2002 obtained Media Arts College status.

History
The school was founded in 1650 by Sir Thomas Adams, the Lord Mayor of London in 1645, who was described by the diarist Samuel Pepys as a "comely old alderman". He was a Sheriff of London, Master of the Company of Drapers and an MP. He was a staunch royalist, who was imprisoned in the Tower of London for his royalist sympathies but was later sent by Parliament to the Hague in 1660 to wait upon King Charles II who was about to be restored to the throne. He also paid for the Bible to translated into Persian.

Adams Grammar School merged with Wem Secondary Modern School in 1976 to form Adams School, later named Thomas Adams School.

In March 2020 the school joined The Priory Trust. The Priory Trust was renamed to the 3-18 Trust.

The school is rated (in 2014 and 2017) by Ofsted to be good. The school has a strong connection with the Drapers Company, an ancient London guild who nominate two governors to sit on the school's governing body. The Drapers Company is well known for its educational connections and charitable contributions, it helps support a number of schools and universities which have historical links with the company.

Notable staff
Samuel Garbet, topographer and local historian of Wem, was second master at Wem Grammar School 1712-42, retiring after declining the school headship.

Notable alumni
Although there is no active alumni association, over 1,400 ex-pupils of Adams Grammar School, Wem Modern School, Adams School and Thomas Adams School are members of the Facebook group Adams School Wem Nostalgia Group.

Notable past-pupils of the Thomas Adams School include:

Wem Grammar School
Peter Jones (actor)
Sandy Lyle, golfer
Sir Henry Maddocks, lawyer/politician
General Sir Charles Warren 
Sir John Bickerton Williams, lawyer, nonconformist historian

Thomas Adams School
Greg Davies, comedian
Paul Jones, footballer
Neil Thomas (gymnast)

References

Secondary schools in Shropshire
Educational institutions established in the 1650s
1650 establishments in England
Boarding schools in Shropshire
Academies in Shropshire
Wem